Hezb-e-Islami (also Hezb-e Islami, Hezb-i-Islami, Hezbi-Islami, Hezbi Islami), lit. Islamic Party, was an Islamist organization that was commonly known for fighting the Communist Government of Afghanistan and their close ally the Soviet Union. Founded and led by Gulbuddin Hekmatyar, it was established in Afghanistan in 1975.

It grew out of the Muslim Youth organization, an Islamist organization founded in Kabul by students and teachers at Kabul University in 1969 to combat communism in Afghanistan. Its membership was drawn from ethnic Pashtuns, and its ideology from the Muslim Brotherhood and Abul Ala Maududi's Jamaat-e-Islami. Another source describes it as having splintered away from Burhanuddin Rabbani's original Islamist party, Jamiat-e Islami, in 1976, after Hekmatyar found that group too moderate and willing to compromise with others.

In 1979, Mulavi Younas Khalis split with Hekmatyar and established his own Hezbi Islami, known as the Khalis faction, with its power base in Nangarhar. Gulbuddin Hekmatyar's faction is since then referred to as the Hezb-e-Islami Gulbuddin, or HIG.

Sources

External links 
Sedra, Mark. "The Taliban still larger than life", Asia Times Online, 2004-03-11.
Afghanistan online. Political parties/groups and leaders in Afghanistan
Declassified October 8, 2002 Report by DIA

Anti-Soviet factions in the Soviet–Afghan War
Islamic political parties in Afghanistan
Islamic organizations established in 1975
Political parties established in 1975
1975 establishments in Afghanistan